The Central District of Aran o Bidgol County is a district (bakhsh) in Aran o Bidgol County, Isfahan Province, Iran. At the 2006 census, its population was 77,150, in 21,209 families.  The District has three cities: Aran o Bidgol, Nushabad, and Sefidshahr. The District has one rural district (dehestan): Sefiddasht Rural District.

References 

Aran va Bidgol County
Districts of Isfahan Province